Good Times, Bad Times... Ten Years of Godsmack is a greatest hits collection by American rock band Godsmack. The collection includes all of Godsmack's singles, with the exception of "Bad Magick", and a DVD of the band's acoustic performance in Las Vegas at the House of Blues.

Commercial performance
Good Times, Bad Times...Ten Years of Godsmack debuted at number 35 on the Billboard 200, selling around 40,000 copies in the first week of release.

Track listing

An Evening with Godsmack DVD track listing
 "Trippin'"
 "Re-Align"
 "Running Blind"
 "Questions" (fan questions part one)
 "Serenity"
 "Voodoo"
 "Questions" (fan questions part two)
 "Spiral"
 "Batalla de los Tambores" (bass and drum solos)
 "Keep Away"
Encore:
 "Touché" (feat. John Kosco and Lee Richards)
 "Reefer Headed Woman" (feat. John Kosco and Lee Richards)

Personnel
Sully Erna - vocals, guitar, drums (tracks 2–5)
Tony Rombola - guitar, backing vocals
Robbie Merrill - bass, backing vocals
Tommy Stewart - drums (tracks 6–8)
Shannon Larkin - drums (tracks 1, 9–16)

DVD credits
Additional vocals: John Kosco
Rhythm guitar: Lee Richards
Directed by: Daniel Catullo
Produced by: Jack Gulick and Daniel Catullo
Mixed by: Andy Johns

Charts

Weekly charts

Year-end charts

Singles

References

2007 greatest hits albums
Godsmack albums
Godsmack video albums 
2007 live albums
2007 video albums
Alternative metal compilation albums
Music video compilation albums
Republic Records compilation albums
Republic Records video albums